Dominic Mai Thanh Lương (20 December 1940 – 6 December 2017) was a Vietnamese-born prelate of the Roman Catholic Church. He was an auxiliary bishop of the Diocese of Orange from 2003-15.

Early life and education
Mai Thanh Lương was born near Hanoi on 20 December 1940, the youngest of nine children. His father worked as a real estate notary. He received his early education at a French Vietnamese elementary school, and afterwards attended Holy Family Seminary High School.

In 1954, he left home against his father's wishes to enter a seminary in Saigon.

In 1956, he was sent by the Bishop of Da Nang to continue his studies in the United States, where he enrolled at a diocesan seminary in Buffalo, New York, two years later. He completed his philosophical and theological studies at St. Bernard's Seminary, Rochester, New York.

Priesthood
Luong was ordained to the priesthood on 21 May 1966. Although ordained for the Diocese of Da Nang, the increasing violence of the Vietnam War prevented him from returning to his native country.

He pursued postgraduate studies at Canisius College in Buffalo, where he earned a Master of Science degree in biology and psychology in 1967. He then served as a chaplain at a hospital in Buffalo until 1975, when he became a curate at St. Louis Church, also in Buffalo.

In 1976, Luong was incardinated in the Archdiocese of New Orleans at the invitation of Archbishop Philip Hannan, who assigned him to the spiritual care of Vietnamese refugees in southern Louisiana.

He became an American citizen the following year. He served as director of the Vietnamese Apostolate from 1976–83, and was named pastor of Mary Queen of Vietnam Church in New Orleans in 1983.

In addition to his pastoral duties, he became rector of the Vietnamese Martyrs Chapel in 1986 and director of the National Center for the Vietnamese Apostolate in 1989. He was made a monsignor in 1986, and served as a member of the archdiocesan priests' council (1987–92) and dean of New Orleans East (2002–03).

Episcopacy
On 25 April 2003, Luong was appointed auxiliary bishop of the Diocese of Orange, California, and titular bishop of Cebarades by Pope John Paul II. He received his episcopal consecration on 11 June from Bishop Tod David Brown, with Archbishop Alfred Clifton Hughes and Bishop Jaime Soto serving as co-consecrators. He selected as his episcopal motto: "You Are Strangers And Aliens No Longer".

Luong has been an outspoken proponent for the rights of Catholics in Vietnam.  He was the first native-born Vietnamese Roman Catholic Bishop in the United States.

The Vatican announced that his resignation was accepted on 20 December 2015, his 75th birthday.

Death
Dominic died on 6 December 2017, aged 77 at Saint Joseph Hospital in Orange County, California.

See also
 

 Catholic Church hierarchy
 Catholic Church in the United States
 Historical list of the Catholic bishops of the United States
 List of Catholic bishops of the United States
 Lists of patriarchs, archbishops, and bishops

References

External links

 Roman Catholic Diocese of Orange Official Site

Episcopal succession

1940 births
2017 deaths
20th-century Vietnamese Roman Catholic priests
Vietnamese emigrants to the United States
21st-century Roman Catholic bishops in the United States
Canisius College alumni
People from Hanoi